Thorunna montrouzieri is a brightly coloured species of sea slug, a dorid nudibranch, a shell-less marine gastropod mollusk in the family Chromodorididae.

Distribution 
This species was described from New Caledonia. It is reported from Queensland, Australia and possibly Okinawa, Japan.

Description

Ecology

References

Chromodorididae
Gastropods described in 1995